Humayd ibn Qahtaba ibn Shabib al-Ta'i was a senior military leader in the early Abbasid Caliphate.

Biography 
Humayd was the son of Qahtaba ibn Shabib al-Ta'i, who along with Abu Muslim led the Abbasid Revolution that toppled the Umayyad Caliphate. Along with his brother Hasan, Humayd was active in the Abbasid cause in Khurasan during the years before the Revolution, serving as a deputy naqib.

After the Revolution, Humayd attached himself to the governor of Syria, Abdallah ibn Ali, and even joined him when he rebelled against the Caliph al-Mansur (r. 754–775) in 754. He soon regretted his decision, however, and escaped Abdallah's camp before his final defeat. Nevertheless, he was soon entrusted with governorships by Mansur, first in the Jazira (754/55), where he faced a determined Kharijite rebellion, and then in Egypt (759/61). In 762/63 he served under Isa ibn Musa in the suppression of the rebellion of Muhammad al-Nafs al-Zakiyya. Three years later, he was appointed to Armenia, and in 768, he was named governor of Khurasan, a post he kept until his death in 776. He was briefly succeeded by his son, Abdallah, who later played a prominent role in the civil war of the Fourth Fitna. As with most of the old Abbasid families, they lost power, although not their wealth, after the triumph of al-Ma'mun in the civil war.

References

Sources 
 

8th-century births
776 deaths
8th-century Abbasid governors of Egypt
Generals of the Abbasid Caliphate
Governors of the Abbasid Caliphate
Upper Mesopotamia under the Abbasid Caliphate
Abbasid governors of Khurasan
Abbasid governors of Egypt
8th-century Arabs
Tayy
Abbasid governors of Arminiya